Northern Highland-American Legion State Forest is a Wisconsin state forest of more than  across Vilas, Oneida, and Iron counties in north-central Wisconsin.  The state forest includes numerous lakes, rivers, and streams.  The most prominent rivers are the Wisconsin, Flambeau, and Manitowish.    The state forest supports a large variety of outdoor recreation activities including camping, hiking, snowmobiling, bicycling, boating, fishing, hunting, and birdwatching.  In addition to recreational activities the state forest also hosts a number of research programs.  The forest is a state-managed timber resource providing opportunities for commercial logging, individual firewood collection, and individual Christmas tree harvesting.

Camping
The forest offers abundant opportunities for campers with a wide range of facilities.  The state forest hosts 18 campgrounds, 2 group camp areas, and 131 remote campsites.  Additionally special permits can be obtained for backcountry backpack camping and deer-hunting camping.

See also
Little Rock Lake
Raven Trail

External links
 Northern Highland-American Legion State Forest official website

Protected areas of Iron County, Wisconsin
Protected areas of Oneida County, Wisconsin
Protected areas of Vilas County, Wisconsin
Wisconsin state forests
Protected areas established in 1925
Nature centers in Wisconsin
1925 establishments in Wisconsin